Abdulabad (known as Abdulyan until 2009) is a village and municipality in the Hajigabul Rayon of Azerbaijan.  It has a population of 3,423.

References

External links
Satellite map at Maplandia.com

Populated places in Hajigabul District